Cahit Külebi (20 December 1917, Tokat – 20 June 1997 Ankara) was a leading Turkish poet and author. He has an important place in contemporary Turkish poetry due to his attachment to folk poetry traditions. His poetry is enriched with simple yet ironic language, embellished with original descriptions.

Biography
Külebi was born in Çeltek, a village of Zile, Tokat Province, Ottoman Empire in 1917. He completed his elementary school in Niksar and his secondary education in Sivas. Then he went to Istanbul and graduated from the Department of Turkish Language and Literature of The School of Higher Education of Teaching (1940). Having finished his education, he worked as a teacher of literature in Antalya and Ankara. In 1964, he served as a cultural attaché of Turkey in Switzerland. Having returned to Turkey, he worked as the general secretary of the Turkish Language Association. He died in Ankara in 1997.

Bibliography

Poetry
 "Adamın Biri" (1946) 
 "Rüzgâr" (1949) 
 "Atatürk Kurtuluş Savaşında" (1952) 
 "Yeşeren Otlar" (1954)
 "Süt" (1965) 
 "Şiirler" (1969) 
 "Türk Mavisi" (1973) 
 "Sıkıntı ve Umut" (1977) 
 "Yangın" (1980)
 "Bütün Şiirleri" (1982) 
 "Güz Türküleri" (1991) 
 "Bütün Şiirleri" (1997) 
 "Güzel Yurdum" (1996)
 "Kamyonlar Kavun Taşır"

Memoirs
 "İçi Sevda Dolu Yolculuk" (1986)

Proses
 "Şiir Her Zaman" (1985)

Essays
 "Ecem'in Günlüğü" (1972)

References
 Biyografi.net - Biography of Cahit Külebi 
 Antoloji.com - Biography of Cahit Külebi

External links
 Cahit Külebi - On his life and poetry
Cahit Külebi's Poems set to Music - Bir Damla Deniz by Poeterra

1917 births
1997 deaths
People from Zile
Turkish poets
Social Democratic Populist Party (Turkey) politicians
20th-century poets